Pseudocatharylla flavipedellus is a moth in the family Crambidae. It was described by Zeller in 1852. It is found in Mozambique, South Africa (KwaZulu-Natal) and Zimbabwe.

References

Crambinae
Moths described in 1852